Kapparot (Ashkenazi transliteration:) is a customary atonement ritual practiced by orthodox Jews on the eve of Yom Kippur. This is a practice in which either money is waved over a person's head and then donated to charity or a chicken is waved over the head and then slaughtered in accordance with halachic rules.

Etymology

Practice

Using a rooster

In one variant of the practice of kapparot, the item to be donated to charity is a rooster. In this case, the rooster would be swung overhead while still alive. After the kapparot ritual is concluded, the rooster would be treated as a normal kosher poultry product, i.e., it would be slaughtered according to the laws of shechita. It would then be given to charity for consumption at the pre-Yom Kippur meal. In modern times, this variant of the ritual is performed with a rooster for men and a hen for women.

In this case, the prayer recited translates as:

Using money
In a second variant of the practice of kapparot, a bag of money is swung around the head and then given to charity.

In this case, the prayer recited translates as:

Sources
The practice of kapparot is mentioned for the first time by Amram ben Sheshna of Sura Academy in Babylonia in 670 and later by Natronai ben Hilai, also of Sura Academy, in 853. According to Joshua Trachtenberg, the rite probably originated toward the end of the Talmudic period. Jewish scholars in the ninth century explained that since the Hebrew word  means both "man" and "rooster", a rooster may substitute as a religious and spiritual vessel in place of a man.

Historical controversy
 Kapparot was strongly opposed by some rabbis, among them Nachmanides, Shlomo ben Aderet, and the Sephardi rabbi Joseph ben Ephraim Karo in the Shulchan Aruch. According to the Mishnah Berurah, his reasoning was based on the caution that it is similar to non-Jewish rites.

The Ashkenazi rabbi Moses Isserles disagreed with Karo and encouraged kapparot. In Ashkenazi communities especially, Rabbi Isserles' position came to be widely accepted, since Ashkenazi Jews will generally follow the halachic rulings of Rabbi Isserles where the Sephardic and Ashkenazic customs differ. It was also approved by Asher ben Jehiel (c. 1250–1327) and his son Jacob ben Asher (1269–1343) and other commentators. Consequently, the practice became generally accepted among the Ashkenazi Jews and Hasidim of Eastern Europe. The Mishnah Berurah agrees with Rabbi Isserles, solidifying support for the practice among Lithuanian Jews as well. The Mishnah Berurah only supports the use of money (i.e., not a chicken) if there might be a problem with the slaughter due to haste or fatigue.

In the late 19th-century work Kaf Hachaim, Yaakov Chaim Sofer approves of the custom for Sephardi Jews as well.

Animal cruelty controversy
Some Jews also oppose the use of chickens for kapparot on the grounds of tza'ar ba'alei chayim, the principle banning cruelty to animals.

On Yom Kippur eve 2005, a number of caged chickens were abandoned in rainy weather as part of a kapparot operation in Brooklyn, New York; some of these starving and dehydrated chickens were subsequently rescued by the American Society for the Prevention of Cruelty to Animals. Jacob Kalish, an Orthodox Jewish man from Williamsburg, Brooklyn, was charged with animal cruelty for the drowning deaths of 35 of these kapparot chickens. In response to such reports of the mistreatment of chickens, Jewish animal rights organizations have begun to picket public observances of kapparot, particularly in Israel.

Proponents of the kapparot ritual in the United States argue the practice to be constitutionally protected as an exercise of freedom of religion in the United States, which is further supported by a 1993 Supreme Court of the United States decision in the case of Church of the Lukumi Babalu Aye v. City of Hialeah. In that case, the court upheld the right of Santería adherents to practice ritual animal sacrifice, with Justice Anthony Kennedy stating in the decision, "Religious beliefs need not be acceptable, logical, consistent or comprehensible to others in order to merit First Amendment protection" (quoted by Justice Kennedy from the opinion by Justice Warren E. Burger in Thomas v. Review Board of the Indiana Employment Security Division). However, the Supreme Court's principal concern in its decision was that the City of Hialeah specifically targeted a religious ritual, curbing the religious rights of a specific community, which conflicts with the First Amendment's Establishment Clause.

See also

 Atonement in Judaism
 Minhag
 Repentance in Judaism
 Tashlikh

References

External links

 Kapparah at the Jewish Encyclopedia online
 Kaparot: Yom Kippur In Crown Heights - slideshow by The Huffington Post

Animal festival or ritual
Animal welfare
Animal sacrifice
Jewish law and rituals
High Holy Days
Yom Kippur
Hebrew words and phrases
Judaism-related controversies